Cheshire County Cricket Club played in List A cricket matches between 1964 and 2004. This is a list of the players who appeared in those matches.

Jhangir Abbas (1999): J Abbas
David Bailey (1981–1983): D Bailey
Andrew Batterley (2002): AJ Batterley
Jonathan Bean (1992–1999): JD Bean
Marlon Black (2003): MI Black
Geoffrey Blackburn (1987–1988): GJ Blackburn
Timothy Bostock (1992–1996): TJ Bostock
Steven Bramhall (1994–2001): S Bramhall
Patrick Briggs (1968): PD Briggs
Denton Brock (2000): DJ Brock
Barrington Browne (2004): BS Browne
Paul Bryson (1995–2002): PRJ Bryson
Ian Cockbain (1985–2001): I Cockbain
Roy Collins (1964–1966): R Collins
Bob Cooke (1981–1983): RMO Cooke
Philip Cottrell (1999): PJ Cottrell
Ian Cowap (1981): I Cowap
Dennis Cox (1964–1966): DF Cox
Stephen Crawley (1986–1993): ST Crawley
Neil Cross (1998–2003): ND Cross
Stuart Cummings (1986–1987): S Cummings
Mark Currie (2001–2002): MR Currie
Barney Cutbill (2002): BJ Cutbill
Hugh de Prez (1987): PH de Prez
Nafees Din (2002–2004): Nafees A Din
Philip Dunkley (1981): PJ Dunkley
Simon Dyson (1989): S Dyson
Stewart Eaton (2001–2002): SM Eaton
Jonathan Farrow (2002): JC Farrow
Christopher Finegan (1992–2002): CC Finegan
Robin Fisher (2001–2004): RW Fisher
Grant Flower (1998): GW Flower
Geoff Foley (2000): GI Foley
Andrew Fox (1987–1989): A Fox
Edward Garnet (1996): ES Garnett
Ian Gemmell (1981–1983): IJ Gemmell
Jonathan Gray (1993–1995): JD Gray
Andrew Greasley (1995–1996): AD Greasley
Peter Hacker (1985): PJ Hacker
Andrew Hall (1994–2004): AJ Hall
Christopher Hall (1999–2000): CJ Hall
Norman Halsall (1964–1968): NR Halsall
Stephen Hampson (1998): SW Hampson
Gerry Hardstaff (1964–1968): GC Hardstaff
Keith Harris (1982): KR Harris
Richard Hignett (1993–2003): RG Hignett
John Hitchmough (1985–1992): JJ Hitchmough
John Hitchmough (1982–1989): JS Hitchmough
Kenneth Holding (1964–1968): KF Holding
Patrick Kelly (1964–1968): PAC Kelly
Martyn Knight (2002): MJ Knight
Abey Kuruvilla (2001): A Kuruvilla
Charles Lamb (1994–2001): CS Lamb
David Leather (1999): D Leather
Daniel Leech (2004): DN Leech
Bryan Lowe (1964): BM Lowe
Mark Makin (2002): M Makin
Simon Marshall (2001–2002): SJ Marshall
Pat McKeown (2001): PC McKeown
Geoff Miller (1992–1994): G Miller
Frederick Millett (1964–1968): FW Millett
Mudassar Nazar (1981–1988): Mudassar Nazar
Tony Murphy (1995–1999): AJ Murphy
John O'Brien (1987–1995): JFM O'Brien
Neil O'Brien (1981–1989): NT O'Brien
Stephen Ogilby (2001–2004): S Ogilby
David Parry (1985): DJ Parry
Nigel Peel (1992–1996): ND Peel
David Pennett (2003–2004): DB Pennett
Clinton Perren (2003–2004): CT Perren
James Pickup (1981–1985): JK Pickup
John Potts (1992–1993): J Potts
James Powell (2001): JCA Powell
Simon Renshaw (1994–2004): SJ Renshaw
Ronald Richardson (1968): RA Richardson
Richard Rodger (1982): RG Rodger
Mark Saxelby (1996): M Saxelby
Richard Shenton (2001): RJ Shenton
Anthony Shillinglaw (1964–1968): AL Shillinglaw
Paul Simmonite (1994): PCP Simmonite
Robert Simpson (1983): RR Simpson
Donald Smith (1968): DJ Smith
Neil Smith (1988–1989): N Smith
Ian Spencer (2003): IS Spencer
Timothy Standing (1992–1993): TPA Standing
Stuart Stoneman (1998–2001): SA Stoneman
Arthur Sutton (1964–1986): JA Sutton
Ian Tansley (1985–1988): IJ Tansley
Mike Taylor (1981): GM Taylor
Timothy Taylor (1981): TJ Taylor
Keith Teasdale (1985–1987): K Teasdale
Philip Thomas (2001): PA Thomas
Paul Tipton (1982–1983): PA Tipton
Simon Twigg (2003–2004): SA Twigg
Eric Upashantha (2002): KEA Upashantha
David Varey (1988–1992): DW Varey
Paul Wakefield (1983): PG Wakefield
Mike Watkinson (1982): M Watkinson
Jason Whittaker (2001–2004): JP Whittaker
Barry Wood (1986–1989): B Wood
Nathan Wood (2001): NT Wood
Stuart Wood (1966–1968): SL Wood
Steve Wundke (1982–1998): SC Wundke
Stephen Yates (1985–1986): SC Yates

References

Cheshire County Cricket Club